The women's downhill of the 2006 Winter Olympics was held at San Sicario, Italy, on Wednesday, 15 February.

Defending Olympic champion Carole Montillet-Carles was nineteenth in the current season's World Cup downhill standings, headed by Michaela Dorfmeister from Austria. Janica Kostelić of Croatia was defending World Champion, but was fourth in the overall World Cup standings, though she did win a downhill at Bad Kleinkirchheim in mid-January.

Dorfmeister won the gold medal, Martina Schild of Switzerland took the silver, and Anja Pärson of Sweden was the bronze medalist. Montillet-Carles finished 28th and Kostelić did not start.

Results
Wednesday, 15 February 2006

The race was started at 12:00 local time, (UTC +1).

References

External links
Official Olympic Report
FIS results
 

Downhill